The 2019 Southeastern Conference men's basketball tournament was a postseason men's basketball tournament for the Southeastern Conference at Bridgestone Arena in Nashville, Tennessee, from March 13–17, 2019. Auburn defeated Tennessee, 84–64, in the championship game to earn an automatic bid to the 2019 NCAA Division I men's basketball tournament.

Seeds

Schedule

Bracket

Game summaries

First round

Second round

Quarterfinals

Semifinals

Championship

See also
2019 SEC women's basketball tournament

References

2018–19 Southeastern Conference men's basketball season
SEC men's basketball tournament
SEC Men's Basketball
Basketball competitions in Nashville, Tennessee
SEC men's basketball tournament
College sports tournaments in Tennessee